The Aberdeen–Inverness line is a railway line in Scotland linking  and . It is not electrified. Most of the line is single-track, other than passing places and longer double-track sections between Insch and Kennethmont and Inverurie and Berryden Junction (Aberdeen).

History
The line was built in three parts:
 Inverness and Nairn Railway between Inverness and Nairn, which opened on 5 November 1855.
 Inverness and Aberdeen Junction Railway between Nairn and Keith which opened in 1858.
 Great North of Scotland Railway between Keith and Aberdeen which opened on 19 September 1854, with the southern portion (between Port Elphinstone and Aberdeen Waterloo) being built over the route of the Aberdeenshire Canal.

The first two parts of the line merged to form the Highland Railway. The Highland Railway operated the line from Inverness to Keith with the Great North operating the line from there to Aberdeen. The Highland was grouped with other railways into the London Midland and Scottish Railway and the Great North was grouped into the London and North Eastern Railway by the Railways Act 1921, before eventually becoming part of British Railways in 1948.

Since 1948
Many intermediate stations and connecting branch lines were closed at various dates during the 1950s and 1960s to both passenger and goods traffic. The 1963 Reshaping of British Railways report recommended the closure of Inverurie and Insch stations but these remain open. In 1968, the route was singled.

Dyce railway station was reopened in 1984.

The railway bridge over the A96 road south of Nairn was replaced in 1991. A new steel-span bridge was constructed adjacent to the existing stone arched bridge. The new bridge was opened in July 1991. This eliminated a bottleneck on the A96 where lights allowed only one direction of traffic under the narrow bridge at a time.

A new freight interchange known as Raith's Farm was opened in 2009 at Dyce.

In 2017, the line through Forres was straightened and a new station built, reinstating the second platform and extending the passing loop there. The platforms at Elgin were extended, the passing loop extended from 650 metres to 1.25 km, and a turnback facility was added. In addition to this, signalling improvements took place which saw control of the line between Inverness and Keith transferred to the Highland signalling centre in Inverness.

In 2019, redoubling work between Aberdeen and Inverurie was completed, though a 1.5 km section north of Aberdeen railway station remains single-track. Much of this is in tunnels, which would have required track lowering to support two tracks. The same year, Dyce and Inverurie signal boxes were closed with control between Kittybrewster to Insch also transferred to the Highland signalling centre. The platforms at Insch railway station were also extended.

Kintore railway station was reopened in October 2020. Inverness Airport railway station (close to the site of the former Dalcross railway station) opened in February 2023.

Current services

All passenger services are operated by ScotRail. There is some limited freight traffic, with Elgin retaining a goods yard, whilst Keith, Huntly and Inverurie retain smaller, less frequently used goods yards. Raith's Farm freight yard at  serves Aberdeen.

In addition to through services, local services operate at each end of the line. An hourly service operates between Elgin and Inverness, while a half-hourly service operates between Inverurie and Aberdeen. Approximately one train per hour continues to Montrose, creating an hourly stopping service between Inverurie and Montrose.

The line serves the following stations:

Future
There are currently plans to extend some of the services and increase the frequency of trains between Inverurie and Aberdeen. This will be part of the Aberdeen Crossrail project. Transport Scotland is also funding an infrastructure improvement project on the route between 2015 and 2030.

Once this work is completed, the line will support an hourly service with a two-hour journey time stopping at all stations between Aberdeen and Inverness.

In the Scottish Government's National Transport Strategy, published in February 2020, it was stated that the line between Aberdeen and Inverurie would be electrified with overhead lines by 2035. The remainder of the route will also be electrified but at a later date.

Reference outside Scotland 
There is a residence hall at the University of California, Riverside that is named after the Aberdeen-Inverness rail line. The Aberdeen-Inverness Residence Hall was the first residence hall at the university and is still in operation today. Originally, Aberdeen, A and B wings, was all male. Inverness, D and E wings, was all female. By the early 1970s, the twin residences became fully coeducational.

Notes

External links

 updated timetable updated 2020

Railway lines in Scotland
Transport in Aberdeen
Transport in Aberdeenshire
Transport in Inverness
Transport in Highland (council area)
Railway lines opened in 1858
Standard gauge railways in Scotland